Sinclair is a community in the Canadian province of Manitoba, approximately  east of the Saskatchewan border and approximately 14 kilometers (9 miles) west of Reston, Manitoba, in the Rural Municipality of Pipestone.

References 

Unincorporated communities in Westman Region